The 2004–05 NCAA Division III men's ice hockey season began on October 15, 2004 and concluded on March 19 of the following year. This was the 32nd season of Division III college ice hockey.

Regular season

Season tournaments

Standings

Note: Mini-game are not included in final standings

2005 NCAA Tournament

Note: * denotes overtime period(s)

See also
 2004–05 NCAA Division I men's ice hockey season

References

External links

 
NCAA